Alan Kennedy (born 31 August 1954) is an English former professional footballer who played the majority of his career as a left back for Newcastle United and then Liverpool. He was a stalwart member of the latter team that won many honours from the late 1970s to the mid-1980s. In all Kennedy was active as a professional in England, Denmark, Belgium and Wales, making over 500 appearances in a career that lasted for 22 years. He also represented England at senior international level.

He is the uncle of the former professional footballer Tom Kennedy.

Club career
Born in Sunderland, Kennedy started his professional career at age 18 for Newcastle United. After establishing his place in the side he played there for five years. He was a member of the team that lost the 1974 FA Cup Final to Liverpool. In 1978 he was transferred to Liverpool for £330,000, at the time a British record amount for a full back.

Kennedy scored in the 1981 League Cup Final again West Ham, which ended 1–1 and was won by Liverpool in the replay. He scored the equalising goal with 15 minutes left in the game in the 1983 League Cup Final against Manchester United, a match Liverpool went on to win in extra time. Kennedy was on two other League Cup winning teams with Liverpool, in 1982 (against Tottenham Hotspur) and 1984 (against Everton).

In the 1981 European Cup Final against Real Madrid, Kennedy scored the only goal of the match late in the second half.

The 1984 European Cup Final between Liverpool and Roma was tied at 1–1 after extra time, so the winner was determined by penalty kicks. Kennedy scored the decisive penalty (the fifth taken by the team, the fourth that was successful) that clinched the victory for Liverpool.

Kennedy was a regular player on the Liverpool teams that won five league championship titles, in 1978–79, 1979–80, 1981–82, 1982–83 and 1983–84.

International career
He also earned two caps for the England national team in 1984.

Personal life
In 2019 and 2020, Kennedy featured as a guest substitute  player in both seasons of ITV show Harry's Heroes, which featured former football manager Harry Redknapp attempting get a squad of former England international footballers back fit and healthy for a game against Germany legends.

Honours

Newcastle United
FA Cup: Runner up 1974
Texaco Cup: 1974/75
League Cup: Runner up 1976

Liverpool
Football League First Division (5): 1978–79, 1979–80, 1981–82, 1982–83, 1983–84
League Cup (4): 1981, 1982, 1983, 1984
Charity Shield (3): 1979, 1980, 1982
European Cup (2): 1981, 1984

References

1954 births
Footballers from Sunderland
Living people
Association football defenders
English footballers
England international footballers
England under-23 international footballers
Newcastle United F.C. players
Liverpool F.C. players
Sunderland A.F.C. players
Wigan Athletic F.C. players
Hartlepool United F.C. players
Boldklubben 1903 players
K. Beerschot V.A.C. players
Northwich Victoria F.C. players
Wrexham A.F.C. players
Colne Dynamoes F.C. players
Morecambe F.C. players
Kendal Town F.C. players
Radcliffe F.C. players
Barrow A.F.C. players
English Football League players
English expatriate footballers
Expatriate men's footballers in Denmark
English expatriate sportspeople in Denmark
Expatriate footballers in Belgium
English expatriate sportspeople in Belgium
UEFA Champions League winning players
FA Cup Final players
Husqvarna FF players